Aeroflot Flight 217 was a non-scheduled international passenger flight from Orly Airport in Paris to Sheremetyevo International Airport in Moscow, with a stopover at Shosseynaya Airport (now Pulkovo Airport) in Leningrad (now Saint Petersburg). On 13 October 1972, the Ilyushin Il-62 airliner operating the flight crashed on approach to Sheremetyevo, with the loss of all 164 passengers and crew of 10. The fatalities include 118 Russians, 38 Chileans, 6 Algerians, one East German and one Australian. At the time, it was the world's deadliest civil aviation disaster, until it was surpassed by the Kano air disaster in 1973. As of 2023, this remains the second-deadliest accident involving an Il-62, after LOT Flight 5055, and the second-deadliest on Russian soil, after Aeroflot Flight 3352.

Crash 
The crew confirmed and started to descend, but later there was no action to return to the horizontal flight. The plane passed the  mark with  vertical velocity, no expected report to ATC and engines still running at low thrust.

Investigation
The cause of the crash could not be determined. Investigators did believe the most probable cause was the 'psycho-physiological incapacitation of the crew for reasons unknown'. Somewhere around  altitude, 30–25 seconds before impact, the pilots either have been incapacitated or lost control of the plane.

See also

Aeroflot accidents and incidents
Aeroflot accidents and incidents in the 1970s

References

External links

Aviation accidents and incidents in the Soviet Union
Aviation accidents and incidents in Russia
Aviation accidents and incidents in 1972
1972 in the Soviet Union
217
Accidents and incidents involving the Ilyushin Il-62
Airliner accidents and incidents with an unknown cause
October 1972 events in Europe